A poultice, also called a cataplasm, is a soft moist mass, often heated and medicated, that is spread on cloth and placed over the skin to treat an aching, inflamed, or painful part of the body. It can be used on wounds, such as cuts.

'Poultice' may also refer to a porous solid filled with a solvent used to remove stains from porous stone such as marble or granite.

The word "poultice" comes from the Greek word "poltos" transformed in the Latin puls, pultes, meaning "porridge".

Types 
 Some Native Americans used mashed pumpkin or devil’s club as a poultice.
 Native Americans have thousands of plants for the making of poultices. The known tribes who utilize(d) plants for poultices include the Abnaki, Aleut, some Algonquin bands, Anticosti, some Apache tribes, Atsugewi, Bella Coola, Blackfoot, Cahuilla, California Indian, Carrier bands, Catawba, Chehalis, Cherokee, some Cheyenne, Chickasaw, Chippewa, Choctaw, Clallam, Coahuilla, some Cocopa, Comanche, Concow, and many more.
 In addition to bread and cereals, bran may also be used as a poultice because of its absorbent quality. It is packed into the wound and then covered with a piece of sacking or similar material before being bandaged onto the site of the wound.
 There are also many commercial poultices that are ready-made. Some of these may be labeled as "drawing salves".
 Ash poultices can cause a chemical burn.

Inflammation treatment 

A poultice is a common treatment used on horses to relieve inflammation. It is usually used on the lower legs, under a stable bandage, to focus treatment on the easily injured tendons in the area. Poultices are sometimes applied as a precautionary measure after the horse has worked hard, such as after racing, jumping, or a cross-country run, to prevent heat and filling. They are also used to treat abscess wounds, where a build-up of pus needs to be drawn out.

Poultices may also be heated and placed on an area where extra circulation is desired.

A poultice is a cooling product that is commonly used for show-jumpers and racehorses, as it is often cheaper and easier to administer than many other cooling products. A poultice is applied to the horse's distal limbs after exercise, for 9–12 hours. The intended effect of the poultice is to cool the horse's legs over a long period of time, by drawing heat out of the leg through evaporation. It is a common practice to bandage over the poultice, using bandages and bandage fillers, and to place either wet newspaper or cellophane wrap between the poultice and bandages, yet bandaging over the poultice may also prevent the action of heat evaporation and, therefore, prevent cooling—i.e., heat can't escape. It is also worth noting dry poultice stores heat.

References

External links 
 

Medical treatments
Equine injury and lameness